Astragalus geminiflorus is a species of legume in the family Fabaceae.
It is found only in Ecuador.
Its natural habitat is subtropical or tropical high-altitude grassland.

References

geminiflorus
Endemic flora of Ecuador
Least concern plants
Taxa named by Aimé Bonpland
Taxonomy articles created by Polbot